Colvocoresses Bay is a bay formed by the right angle of the Budd Coast at Williamson Glacier. It was delineated by G.D. Blodgett (1955) from aerial photographs taken by U.S. Navy Operation Highjump (1946–47), and named by the Advisory Committee on Antarctic Names for George Colvocoresses, midshipman on the sloop Vincennes during the United States Exploring Expedition (1838–42) under Charles Wilkes. Colvocoresses, later promoted to captain, U.S. Navy, published (1852–55) his own account of the voyage in Four Years in the Government Exploring Expedition Commanded by Captain Wilkes.

References 

Bays of Wilkes Land